Qingpu Special District, also known as Taoyuan Qingpu HSR Special Area, is located at the border of Zhongli District and Dayuan District in Taoyuan, Taiwan. The total area of Qingpu Special District is 490 hectares. It was designed in the 2000s after the Taoyuan HSR station opened in 2007 and developed from the 2010s onward, before the city was upgraded from county to special municipality. Qingpu Special District was designated as the new prime central business district, administration center, shopping center, and transport hub of Taoyuan City, replacing the old city center around Taoyuan railway station. Important infrastructure, such as Taoyuan HSR station, Rakuten Taoyuan Baseball Stadium, Taoyuan Sunlight Arena and Hengshan Calligraphy Art Center, is located within this area. The decision to earmark Qingpu as the new prime center reflects its location: it is in close proximity to Taoyuan International Airport and is only one or two stops away from cities such as Hsinchu and Taipei by high speed rail. In 2016, Qingpu hosted the Taiwan Lantern Festival.

Future Developments 

Qingpu Special District and Taoyuan Aerotropolis will be the demonstration sites for IoT-related industries such as 5G, autonomous cars, and smart traffic, linked to the Asian Silicon Valley Project, which plans to establish an Innovation and Research and Development Center, and the Taoyuan Exhibition Center in Qingpu. Qingpu is often said to be the Xinyi Planning District of Taoyuan. 

Despite its recent rapid progress in development, Qingpu still lacks many fundamental facilities, such as medical facilities and higher education institutes, as a self-contained planned district. National Tsinghua University has planned to open its own hospital Tsinghua University Taoyuan Hospital, which was approved by the Medical Affairs Review Committee of the Ministry of Health and Welfare on March 14, 2022 and is planned to start operations in 2027. It plans to serve residents from the surrounding districts of Luzhu, Dayuan and Guanyin, which currently lack large hospitals. The general acute hospital beds will be expanded to reach the 499 beds approved by the Taoyuan Municipal Health Bureau before the medical review meeting to fully meet the local medical needs.

Transportation

Rail

High Speed Rail
 Taoyuan HSR station

Metro
 Taoyuan Airport MRT
 Linghang metro station
 Taoyuan HSR station
 Taoyuan Sports Park metro station

Road 
National Freeway 1
National Freeway 2
Provincial Highway 31

Public Facilities

Sports 

 Taoyuan International Baseball Stadium
 Qingpu Sports Park

Parks 
 Qingtang Park

Education 
 Taoyuan Municipal Dayuan International Senior High School

Commercial Facilities 

 Gloria Outlets
 Global Mall Taoyuan A19
 IKEA Taoyuan Store
 Shin Kong Cinemas Taoyuan Qingpu Store
 Xpark

Supermarkets 
 Carrefour Qingpu Store
 PX Mart Zhongli Linghang & Dayuan Chunde Stores

Gallery

See also 
 Xinyi Planning District
 Xinban Special District
 Xinzhuang Sub-city Center
 Taoyuan Zhongzheng Arts and Cultural Business District
 Urban planning
 Taoyuan Aerotropolis

References 

Central business districts in Taiwan
Economy of Taoyuan City
Planned cities in Taiwan